Saviour Tui (born 17 October 2001) is a Samoa netball international. Tui was a member of three title winning teams in New Zealand's National Netball League. In 2018 and 2019, Tui won titles with Central Zone/Central Manawa. In 2021 she won a third title with Northern Marvels. She was also a member of the Central Pulse team that won the 2018 Netball New Zealand Super Club tournament. She was a fringe member of the 2021 Northern Mystics team that were ANZ Premiership champions. Since 2022, she has played for Southern Steel in the ANZ Premiership.

Early life, family and education
Tui is a Samoan New Zealander. She also has Tokelauan ancestry. She was raised in Wainuiomata
in Lower Hutt. She was educated at St Mary's College, Wellington.

Playing career

Central Zone/Central Manawa
In 2018 and 2019, Tui played for Central Zone/Central Manawa in the National Netball League. She was just 16 and still at school when first included in the Central Zone team. She was subsequently a member of two Central Zone/Central Manawa NNL title winning teams. After helping Central Zone win a second title in 2018, she helped, the now renamed Central Manawa, complete a three in a row in 2019. In the 2019 final, Tui, scored 36 from 38 as they defeated Waikato Bay of Plenty 49–46.

Central Pulse
Tui played for Central Pulse in the 2018 Netball New Zealand Super Club tournament. She played and scored for Pulse in all three group stage matches.

Northern Mystics
Between 2019 and 2021,  Tui played for Northern Mystics. She was a member of the Mystics team that finished as runners up in the 2019 Netball New Zealand Super Club tournament. She was subsequently a regular in 2020 Mystics team. She was only a fringe member of the 2021 Northern Mystics team that were ANZ Premiership champions. She played just 14 minutes of game time, down from 374 minutes in 2020. Tui was kept out of the team by Grace Nweke, Bailey Mes and Filda Vui. However she was a prominent member of the Northern Marvels team, the Mystics reserve team, that were 2021 National Netball League champions. Tui played all nine NNL matches for Marvels and she finished the season as the NNL top scorer with 337 goals and a 91% accuracy rate. In the grand final she scored 56 from 58 as Marvels defeated Northern Comets 64–56. She was also named player of the match. It was Marvels' first NNL title and Tui's third.  She was subsequently named National Netball League Player of the Year.

Southern Steel
Ahead of the 2022 season, Tui signed for Southern Steel.

International

New Zealand
In 2018 and 2019, Tui was included in New Zealand schoolgirl squads. She also played for the New Zealand under 21s in the 2020 Cadbury Netball Series.

Samoa
In July 2022, Tui played for Samoa at the 2023 Netball World Cup Oceania qualifiers.

Statistics

ANZ Premiership

|- 
! scope="row" style="text-align:center" | 2020
|style="text-align:center;"|Mystics
|||43||1||105||65||0||1||5||20||13
|- style="background-color: #eaeaea"
! scope="row" style="text-align:center" | 2021
|style="text-align:center;"|Mystics
|||1||1||3||4||0||0||0||1||3 
|- 
! scope="row" style="text-align:center" | 2022
|style="text-align:center;"|Steel
|||65||5||85||98||3||1||4||44||12 
|- style="background-color: #eaeaea"
! scope="row" style="text-align:center" | 2023
|style="text-align:center;"|Steel
||| ||  || || || || || || || 
|- class="sortbottom"
! colspan=2| Career
! 
! 
! 
! 
! 
! 
! 
! 
! 
! 
|}

Honours
Northern Mystics
ANZ Premiership
Winners: 2021 
Minor premiers: 2021
Netball New Zealand Super Club
Runners Up: 2019
Central Pulse
Netball New Zealand Super Club
Winners: 2018
Central Zone/Central Manawa
National Netball League
Winners: 2018, 2019 
Northern Marvels
National Netball League
Winners: 2021

Individual Awards

References

Living people
2001 births
Samoan netball players
New Zealand netball players
ANZ Premiership players
National Netball League (New Zealand) players
Central Pulse players
Central Manawa players
Northern Mystics players
Southern Steel players
People educated at St Mary's College, Wellington
New Zealand sportspeople of Samoan descent
Sportspeople from Lower Hutt